Hendijan (also known as MIG-S-4700) is a class of auxiliary ships operated by the Islamic Republic of Iran Navy. The first eight of this class were built by Dutch Damen Group, and the rest by Iran's Marine Industries Organization, Bandar Abbas. According to Jane's, ships of the class are tenders that are used for coastal surveillance and one of them is used as a training ship. IISS classifies all vessels as patrol boats.

Design

Dimensions and machinery 
It uses two shafts, powered by two Mitsubishi S16MPTK diesel engines.

Sensors and processing systems 
For navigation, Hendijan-class vessels rely on Raccal Decca or China RM 1070A on I-band.

Armament 
Hendijan-class vessels are reportedly equipped with one 20 mm GAM-BO1 cannon and two 12.7 mm machine guns. At least two of them (Kalat and Sirik) were modified to fire for Noor anti-ship cruise missile, as of 2015. IISS mentions three equipped with AShM in 2020.

Ships in the class
The ships in the class are:

References 

Ship classes of the Islamic Republic of Iran Navy
Auxiliary depot ship classes
Auxiliary tender classes
Auxiliary training ship classes
Patrol boat classes
Ships built at Shahid Darvishi shipyard
Damen Group